In Greek mythology, the primordial deities are the first generation of gods and goddesses. These deities represented the fundamental forces and physical foundations of the world and were generally not actively worshipped, as they, for the most part, were not given human characteristics; they were instead personifications of places or abstract concepts.

Hesiod, in his Theogony, considers the first beings (after Chaos) to be Gaia, Tartarus, Eros, Erebus, Hemera and Nyx. Gaia and Uranus in turn gave birth to the Titans, and the Cyclopes. The Titans Cronus and Rhea then gave birth to the generation of the Olympians, Zeus, Poseidon, Hades, Hestia, Hera and Demeter, who overthrow the Titans, with the reign of Zeus marking the end of the period of warfare and usurpation among the gods.

Hesiod's primordial genealogy

Hesiod's Theogony, (c. 700 BCE) which could be considered the "standard" creation myth of Greek mythology, tells the story of the genesis of the gods. After invoking the Muses (II.1–116), Hesiod tells of the generation of the first four primordial deities:

"First Chaos came to be, but next... Earth... and dim Tartarus in the depth of the... Earth, and Eros..." 

According to Hesiod, the next primordial gods that come to be are:
 Darkness and Night (born of Chaos)
 Light and Day (born of Night and Darkness)
 Heaven and Ocean (parthenogenetically born of Earth)

First generation 
 Chaos (Void) 
 Gaia (Earth) 
 Uranus (Sky)
 Ourea (Mountains) 
 Pontus (Sea) 
 Tartarus (Underworld) 
 Erebus (Darkness)
 Nyx (Night) 
 Aether (Light) 
 Hemera (Day) 
 Eros (Love) (in later myths, the name of Aphrodite and Ares' son)

Other sources
 Achlys (Misery) 
 Ananke (Compulsion) 
 Chronos (Time)
 Phanes (Procreation)
 Aion (Eternity) 
 Nesoi (Islands) 
 Moirai (Fate) 
 Moros (Doom)

Chaos 
In Hesiod's creation myth, Chaos is the first being to ever exist. Chaos is both seen as a deity and a thing, with some sources seeing chaos as the gap between Heaven and Earth. In some accounts Chaos existed first alongside Eros and Nyx, while in others Chaos is the first and only thing in the universe. In some stories, Chaos is seen as existing beneath Tartarus. Chaos is the parent to Night and Darkness.

Gaia 
Gaia was the second being to be formed, right after Chaos, in Hesiod's theogony, and parthenogenetically gave birth to Heaven, who would later become her husband and her equal, the Sea, and to the high Mountains.

Gaia is a mother earth figure and is seen as the mother of all the gods, while also being the seat on which they exist. Gaia is the Greek Equivalent to the Roman goddess, Tellus / Terra. The story of Uranus' castration at the hands of Cronus due to Gaia's involvement is seen as the explanation for why Heaven and Earth are separated. In Hesiod's story, Earth seeks revenge against Heaven for hiding her children the Cyclopes deep within her, Gaia then goes to her other children and asks for their help to get revenge against their cruel father; of her children, only Cronus, the youngest and "most dreadful" of them all agrees to do this. Gaia plans an ambush against Uranus where she hides Cronus and gives him the sickle to castrate him. From the blood Gaia again become pregnant with the Furies, the Giants, and the Melian nymphs. Cronus goes on to have six children with his sister, Rhea; who become the Olympians. Cronus is later overthrown by his son, Zeus, much in the same way he overthrew his father. Gaia is the mother to the twelve Titans; Okeanus, Kois, Kreios, Hyperion, Iapetos, Theia, Rhea, Themis, Mnemosyne, Phoibe, Tethys, and Cronus.

Later in the myth, after his succession, Cronus learns from his mother and father that his own son (Zeus) will overthrow him, as he did Uranus. To prevent this, Cronus swallowed all of his children with his sister Rhea as soon as they were born. Rhea sought out Gaia for help in hiding her youngest son, Zeus, and gave Cronus a rock instead to swallow. Zeus later went on to defeat his father and become the leader of the Olympians.

After Zeus's succession to the throne, Gaia bore another son with Tartarus, Typhon, a monster who would be the last to challenge Zeus's authority.

Sky and Earth have three sets of children: the Titans, the Cyclopes, and the Hecatoncheires.

Nyx 
Nyx (Night) is the mother of the Moirai (The Fates) and many other offspring. In some variations of Hesiod's Theogony, Nyx is told as having black wings; and in one tale she laid an egg in Erebus from which Love sprang out.  With Erebus (Darkness) she has Aether and Hemera, both embodying the antithesis of their parents. However, the children Nyx has through parthenogenesis reflect the dark aspects of the goddess. One version of Hesiod's tale tells that Night shares her house with Day in Tartarus, but that the two are never home at the same time. However, in some versions Nyx's home is where Chaos and Tartarus meet, suggesting to the idea that Chaos resides beneath Tartarus.

Children of Nyx 

 The Moirai (Fates)
 Clotho
 Lachesis
 Atropos
 Achlys (Sorrow)
 Hypnos (Sleep)
 Thanatos (Peaceful Death)
 The Hesperides (Sunset)
 Nemesis (Revenge)
 Eris (Strife)
 Apate (Deceit)
 Oizys (Misery)
 Moros (Doom)
 Oneiroi (Dreams), sometimes said to be Hypnos' sons, rather than as his siblings.
 Philotes (Affection)
 Geras (Old Age)
 Charon (The Ferryman)
 The Keres (Violent Death)
 Momus (Mockery)
 Hecate (Crossroads and Magic)

Eros 
Eros is the god of love in Greek mythology, and in some versions of Greek mythology, is one of the primordial beings that first came to be parentlessly. In Hesiod's version, Eros was the "fairest among the immortal gods ... who conquers the mind and sensible thoughts of all gods and men."

Tartarus 
Tartarus is described by Hesiod as both a primordial deity and also a great abyss where the Titans are imprisoned. Tartarus is seen as a prison, but is also where Day, Night, Sleep, and Death dwell, and also imagined as a great gorge that's a distinct part of the underworld. Hesiod tells that it took nine days for the Titans to fall to the bottom of Tartarus, describing how deep the abyss is. In some versions Tartarus is described as a "misty darkness" where Death, Styx, and Erebus reside.

Non-Hesiodic theogonies 
The ancient Greeks entertained different versions of the origin of primordial deities. Some of these stories were possibly inherited from the pre-Greek Aegean cultures.

Homeric primordial theogony
The Iliad, an epic poem attributed to Homer about the Trojan War (an oral tradition of  700–600 BCE), states that Oceanus (and possibly Tethys, too) is the parent of all the deities.

Other Greek theogonies 
 Alcman (fl. 7th century BCE) called Thetis the first goddess, producing poros (path), tekmor (marker), and skotos (darkness) on the pathless, featureless void.
 Orphic poetry ( 530 BCE) made Nyx the first principle, Night, and her offspring were many. Also, in the Orphic tradition, Phanes (a mystic Orphic deity of light and procreation, sometimes identified with the Elder Eros) is the original ruler of the universe, who hatched from the cosmic egg.
 Aristophanes ( 446–386 BCE) wrote in his play The Birds that Nyx was the first deity also, and that she produced Eros from an egg.

Note* Tekmor and Pothos are sometimes also counted among the Protogenoi.

Philosophical theogonies 
Philosophers of Classical Greece also constructed their own metaphysical cosmogonies, with their own primordial deities:

 Pherecydes of Syros, ( 600–550 BC) in his Heptamychia, wrote that there were three divine principles, who came before all things, and who have always existed: Zas (Ζάς, Zeus), Cthonie (Χθονίη, Earth), and Chronos (Χρόνος, Time).
 Empedocles ( 490–430 BC) wrote that there were four elements which ultimately make up everything: fire, air, water, and earth. He said that there were two divine powers, Philotes (Love) and Neikos (Strife), who wove the universe out of these elements.
 Plato ( 428–347 BC) introduced (in Timaeus) the concept of the demiurge, who had modeled the universe on the Ideas.

Interpretation of primordial deities 
Scholars dispute the meaning of the primordial deities in the poems of Homer and Hesiod. Since the primordials give birth to the Titans, and the Titans give birth to the Olympians, one way of interpreting the primordial gods is as the deepest and most fundamental nature of the cosmos.

For example, Jenny Strauss Clay argues that Homer's poetic vision centers on the reign of Zeus, but that Hesiod's vision of the primordials put Zeus and the Olympians in context. Likewise, Vernant argues that the Olympic pantheon is a "system of classification, a particular way of ordering and conceptualizing the universe by distinguishing within it various types of powers and forces." But even before the Olympic pantheon were the Titans and primordial gods. Homer alludes to a more tumultuous past before Zeus was the undisputed King and Father.

Mitchell Miller argues that the first four primordial deities arise in a highly significant relationship. He argues that Chaos represents differentiation, since Chaos differentiates (separates, divides) Tartarus and Earth. Even though Chaos is "first of all" for Hesiod, Miller argues that Tartarus represents the primacy of the undifferentiated, or the unlimited. Since undifferentiation is unthinkable, Chaos is the "first of all" in that he is the first thinkable being. In this way, Chaos (the principle of division) is the natural opposite of Eros (the principle of unification). Earth (light, day, waking, life) is the natural opposite of Tartarus (darkness, night, sleep, death). These four are the parents of all the other Titans.

See also

 Bibliotheca (Pseudo-Apollodorus)
 Ex nihilo
 Family tree of the Greek gods

Notes

References 

 Hard, Robin, The Routledge Handbook of Greek Mythology: Based on H.J. Rose's "Handbook of Greek Mythology", Psychology Press, 2004, . Google Books.
Hesiod, Theogony, in The Homeric Hymns and Homerica with an English Translation by Hugh G. Evelyn-White, Cambridge, Massachusetts, Harvard University Press; London, William Heinemann Ltd. 1914. Online version at the Perseus Digital Library.

External links

Greek Primeval Deities

 
Primordial deities
Mythology-related lists